Quzandria Nur Dato' Mahamad Fathil (born 25 April 1982) is a Malaysian equestrian rider. Nur competed at three Asian Games, in Bangkok 1998, Doha 2006 and Guangzhou 2010. In 1998 she was member of the silver winning Malaysian team, in 2006 she won also team silver and in 2010 she won individual silver and team bronze. Nur also competed at three South East Asian Games. In 2001 she won team gold and individual silver, in 2007 again a golden team medal and individual silver, and in 2017 she won individual gold and team gold with the Malaysian team.

Her brother Qabil Ambak is also an international dressage and jumping rider who is representing Malaysia. Together they were team members during several Asian Championships. In 2012 Nur tried to qualify for the 2012 Olympic Games by training with Olympic Champion Anky van Grunsven.

References

1982 births
Living people
Malaysian equestrians
Malaysian dressage riders
Asian Games silver medalists for Malaysia
Asian Games bronze medalists for Malaysia
Asian Games medalists in equestrian
Equestrians at the 1998 Asian Games
Equestrians at the 2002 Asian Games
Equestrians at the 2006 Asian Games
Equestrians at the 2010 Asian Games
Medalists at the 1998 Asian Games
Medalists at the 2006 Asian Games
Medalists at the 2010 Asian Games
Competitors at the 2017 Southeast Asian Games
Competitors at the 2007 Southeast Asian Games
Competitors at the 2001 Southeast Asian Games
Southeast Asian Games medalists in equestrian
Southeast Asian Games gold medalists for Malaysia
Southeast Asian Games silver medalists for Malaysia